Ruby Reynolds-Lewis (13 November 1881 – 13 December 1964) was an Australian composer. Her work, "Foxhunt", was entered in the music event in the art competition at the 1924 Summer Olympics. She was the only Australian artist to compete in the Olympic arts competitions held from 1912 to 1948.

Reynolds-Lewis dedicated her 1919 composition, "Cradle Song", to artist and musician George Hyde Pownall. Although named a "song", it was described as a piano solo and no words were published.

She was a member of the Austral Salon during the 1930s.

Personal life
Born in South Yarra, Victoria on 13 November 1881, Ruby Reynolds-Lewis was the only daughter of Philip Edward and Mary Emmeline Reynolds. Her father, an importer, died in Adelaide at the age of 34 in February 1883. In November 1901 she married Thomas Griffith Lewis at St Luke's, South Melbourne. Her husband died in 1920, leaving her to provide for their four children, Hilary, Tom, and twins Valmai and Valerie.

Selected compositions
 "The Voice"
 "Cradle Song", 1919
 "Retrospection"
 "Playing the Game", 1923
 "Foxhunt", 1924
 "Wattle Gold", 1930
 "Honey Babe", 1956

References

External links
 Sheet music for "The Voice" by Ruby Reynolds-Lewis from the National Library of Australia

1881 births
1964 deaths
Australian women composers
Olympic competitors in art competitions
Musicians from Melbourne
People from South Yarra, Victoria